Lincoln Cássio de Souza Soares (born 22 January 1979), commonly known as Lincoln, is a Brazilian former professional footballer who played as an attacking midfielder.

Career

Atlético Mineiro
Lincoln was born in São Brás do Suaçuí. He was a member of the 1999 Atlético Mineiro team, who were runners-up in Campeonato Brasileiro Série A, a team that also included Marques, Juliano Belletti, Caçapa, Carlos Galván, and the 1999 top scorer Guilherme, among others.

Kaiserslautern
Lincoln was signed in 2001 by Kaiserslautern as a replacement for playmaker Ciriaco Sforza, who was bought by Bayern Munich. The slender, but technically gifted Lincoln made an immediate impact and contributed to a strong Kaiserslautern finish in that season. However, trouble was afoot within the club from Rhineland-Palatinate: heavy internal friction was experienced and this was not helped by a large turnover of players. The last straw was when Lincoln disappeared in spring 2004; it turned out that he had headed back to his native Brazil as he felt it would be better for an injury he was apparently suffering from. This was not endorsed by the club and earned him a season-long suspension. Many of the club's fans, members of the board, and playing staff were left embittered by the fact that Lincoln left the club while they struggled against relegation.

Schalke 04
Lincoln's reputation had suffered and it was seen as a surprise when Schalke 04 signed the playmaker. However, his game flourished while at the Ruhrgebiet club, and he was one of the strongest pillars in the surprising Schalke 2004–05 campaign that earned them second place in the Bundesliga. Although Lincoln experienced a dip in form in 2005–06, he firmly established himself as one of the best playmakers in the Bundesliga.

Galatasaray
In June 2007, Lincoln signed a four-year contract for Galatasaray, for a fee of around €5 million. He was greeted at the Atatürk International Airport with a crowd of 5,000 Galatasaray supporters.

Lincoln scored five times in his first season in the 2007–08 Turkcell Süper Lig and he made a few important assists, showing great performances both in domestic play and UEFA Cup games. He became a favorite of the Galatasaray fans. However, he was taken out of the squad of the seventh week clash against the arch-rivals Beşiktaş. Karl-Heinz Feldkamp took Lincoln and teammate Hakan Şükür out of the match squad because they had broken the camp rules by bringing family and friends to training. After the 2–1 win, thanks to the goals of Hakan Balta and Shabani Nonda (penalty), some have called Feldkamp a braveheart and a hero, but many other supporters criticised him because of the decision.

He eventually had the opportunity to play against rivals Fenerbahçe on 9 November 2008 and scored one of the quickest goals ever seen in a Fenerbahçe – Galatasaray derbies, exactly 1:30 after the opening kickoff; however, Galatasaray gave up four straight goals after this and lost the game 4–1.

As the playmaker of the team, Lincoln was selected as the team captain in a UEFA Cup game against Hertha BSC on 3 December 2008.

In July 2009, Galatasaray put Lincoln on suspension due to his absence during pre-season training. He was later released from the Turkish side and his squad number 10 was issued to the newly appointed captain, Arda Turan.

Palmeiras
On 4 February 2010, Lincoln signed a two-year contract with SE Palmeiras. On 8 May 2010, he scored the goal to beat Vitoria 1–0 in opening round of the 2010 Campeonato Brasileiro. He made impressive appearances with Palmeiras in 2010.
In 2011, Lincoln was not in the plans of manager Luiz Felipe Scolari, and failed to make usual appearances. He stated that he would like to play more or leave the club.

Avaí
On 10 August 2011, Avaí announced that Lincoln signed a loan contract with the club from Palmeiras.

Coritiba
In 2012, Coritiba signed Lincoln on a two-year contract. He won with the club the 2012 and 2013 Campeonato Paranaense.

Bahia
In 2014, he was loaned to Bahia until the end of the year.

Career statistics

Honours
Schalke 04
 UEFA Intertoto Cup: 2004
 DFB-Ligapokal:  2005
 Bundesliga Player of the month: November 2004
 Schalke 04 Player of the year: 2004–05
 Nominated as one of the five best players in Bundesliga 2006, by kicker.

Galatasaray
 Turkish League: 2007–08
 Turkish Super Cup: 2008

Coritiba
 Campeonato Paranaense: 2012, 2013

Bahia
 Campeonato Baiano: 2014

References

External links
 

Living people
1979 births
Association football midfielders
Brazilian footballers
Brazilian expatriate footballers
Campeonato Brasileiro Série A players
Bundesliga players
Süper Lig players
Clube Atlético Mineiro players
1. FC Kaiserslautern players
FC Schalke 04 players
Galatasaray S.K. footballers
Sociedade Esportiva Palmeiras players
Avaí FC players
Coritiba Foot Ball Club players
Esporte Clube Bahia players
Expatriate footballers in Germany
Brazilian expatriate sportspeople in Germany
Brazilian expatriate sportspeople in Turkey
Expatriate footballers in Turkey